Paul Hill is the name of:

 Paul Hill (musician) (1934–1999), American music director, founder of the Master Chorale of Washington (formerly the Paul Hill Chorale)
 Paul Jennings Hill (1954–2003), the murderer of abortion provider John Britton
 Paul Hill (Guildford Four) (born 1954), Irish man convicted and later cleared of terrorist offences
 Paul Hill (flight director) (born 1962), American flight director for NASA Mission Control Center
 Paul Hill (rugby union) (born 1995), English rugby union player
 Paul Andrew Raymond Clegg-Hill (born 1979), heir apparent to the British title of Viscount Hill
 Paul R. Hill (1909–1990), American aerodynamicist